Antiblemma is a genus of moths of the family Noctuidae.

Species

Antiblemma abas (Schaus 1914)
Antiblemma abstrusa (Schaus 1911)
Antiblemma acclinalis Hubner 1823
Antiblemma accumulata (Schaus 1914)
Antiblemma acidalia (Holland 1894)
Antiblemma acron (Schaus 1914)
Antiblemma acrosema (Mabille 1900)
Antiblemma addana (Schaus 1911)
Antiblemma aeson (Schaus 1914)
Antiblemma agnita (Druce 1890)
Antiblemma agrestis (Schaus 1911)
Antiblemma agrotera (Druce 1890)
Antiblemma albicosta (Dyar 1909)
Antiblemma albicostata (Poole 1989)
Antiblemma albipunctata (Druce 1900)
Antiblemma albizonea Hampson 1924
Antiblemma alcinoe (Druce 1890)
Antiblemma amalthea (Schaus 1911)
Antiblemma amarga (Schaus 1911)
Antiblemma andersoni Schaus 1940
Antiblemma anguinea (Schaus 1911)
Antiblemma anhypa (Guenee 1852)
Antiblemma anthea (Schaus 1914)
Antiblemma argyrozonea Hampson 1926
Antiblemma baccata (Schaus 1914)
Antiblemma barcas (Schaus 1914)
Antiblemma barine (Schaus 1914)
Antiblemma binota Felder & Rogenhofer 1874
Antiblemma bira Felder & Rogenhofer 1874
Antiblemma bistriata (Butler 1879)
Antiblemma bistriga (Moschler 1886)
Antiblemma boliviensis (Dognin 1912)
Antiblemma borrega (Schaus 1901)
Antiblemma brassorata Kaye 1925
Antiblemma brevipennis (Walker 1865)
Antiblemma c-album (Felder & Rogenhofer 1874)
Antiblemma calais (Schaus 1914)
Antiblemma calida (Butler 1878)
Antiblemma californica (Behr 1870)
Antiblemma caparata Kaye 1925
Antiblemma catenosa (Guenee 1852)
Antiblemma censura (Dognin 1912)
Antiblemma ceras (Druce 1898)
Antiblemma ceres (Schaus 1914)
Antiblemma chephira (Schaus 1911)
Antiblemma chiva (Schaus 1911)
Antiblemma cinereoides Poole 1989
Antiblemma cingulata (Cramer 1782)
Antiblemma concinnula (Walker 1865)
Antiblemma contenta (Moschler 1880)
Antiblemma dentimargo Hampson 1926
Antiblemma deois (Schaus 1914)
Antiblemma diffinota Kaye 1925
Antiblemma diplogramma Hampson 1926
Antiblemma discobola Hampson 1926
Antiblemma discomaculata (Brabant 1910)
Antiblemma distacta (Hampson 1898)
Antiblemma erythromma Hampson 1926
Antiblemma eschata Hampson 1924
Antiblemma eurytermes Hampson 1926
Antiblemma exhilarans (Walker 1858)
Antiblemma extima (Walker 1868)
Antiblemma filaria (Smith 1900)
Antiblemma fulvicentralis Hampson 1926
Antiblemma fulvipicta Hampson 1926
Antiblemma furvipars Hampson 1926
Antiblemma gladysia (Schaus 1914)
Antiblemma glaucosia Hampson 1926
Antiblemma gromatica (Dognin 1912)
Antiblemma hamilcar (Schaus 1914)
Antiblemma hannibal (Schaus 1914)
Antiblemma harmodia (Schaus 1901)
Antiblemma hembrilla (Schaus 1912)
Antiblemma herilis (Schaus 1913)
Antiblemma hersilea (Schaus 1912)
Antiblemma ignifera (Dognin 1912)
Antiblemma imitans (Walker 1858)
Antiblemma imitatura (Walker 1858)
Antiblemma incarnans Felder & Rogenhofer 1874
Antiblemma inconspicua (Herrich-Schaffer 1870)
Antiblemma indigna (Butler 1879)
Antiblemma inferior (Warren 1889)
Antiblemma invenusta (Walker 1865)
Antiblemma irene (Guenee 1852)
Antiblemma juruana (Butler 1879)
Antiblemma lacteigera (Butler 1879)
Antiblemma lappa (Druce 1890)
Antiblemma laranda (Druce 1890)
Antiblemma lateritia (Dognin 1912)
Antiblemma leucocyma Hampson 1926
Antiblemma leucomochla Hampson 1924
Antiblemma leucospila (Walker 1865)
Antiblemma lilacina (Dognin 1912)
Antiblemma linens (Felder & Rogenhofer 1874)
Antiblemma linula (Guenee 1852)
Antiblemma lola (Schaus 1901)
Antiblemma lothos (Cramer 1777)
Antiblemma luna (Guenee 1852)
Antiblemma lycoris (Schaus 1912)
Antiblemma melanoides (Moschler 1880)
Antiblemma melanosemata Hampson 1926
Antiblemma memoranda (Schaus 1911)
Antiblemma mundicola (Walker 1865)
Antiblemma nannodes Hampson 1926
Antiblemma neptis (Cramer 1779)
Antiblemma nigerrimasigna (Strand 1920)
Antiblemma nitidaria (Stoll 1782)
Antiblemma notiaphila (Butler 1879)
Antiblemma ochrilineata (Dognin 1912)
Antiblemma ochrozonea Hampson 1926
Antiblemma ocina (Druce 1900)
Antiblemma octalis Hubner 1823
Antiblemma odontozona Hampson 1926
Antiblemma orbiculata (Felder & Rogenhofer 1874)
Antiblemma ortega (Dognin 1897)
Antiblemma palindica (Schaus 1901)
Antiblemma pallida (Butler 1879)
Antiblemma paraddana (Dognin 1912)
Antiblemma partita (Schaus 1914)
Antiblemma patifaciens (Walker 1858)
Antiblemma pelops (Schaus 1914)
Antiblemma penelope (Schaus 1911)
Antiblemma perornata (Schaus 1911)
Antiblemma peruda (Schaus 1911)
Antiblemma phaedra (Schaus 1914)
Antiblemma phoenicopyra Hampson 1926
Antiblemma pira (Druce 1898)
Antiblemma pobra (Dognin 1897)
Antiblemma polyodon Hampson 1926
Antiblemma porphyrota Hampson 1926
Antiblemma prisca (Moschler 1890)
Antiblemma prospera (Walker 1858)
Antiblemma punctistriga (Herrich-Schaffer 1870)
Antiblemma purpuripicta Hampson 1926
Antiblemma pyralicolor (Guenee 1852)
Antiblemma quarima (Schaus 1901)
Antiblemma recocta (Dognin 1912)
Antiblemma restricta (Brabant 1910)
Antiblemma rhoda (Druce 1898)
Antiblemma rotundifera (Walker 1858)
Antiblemma rubecula (Felder & Rogenhofer 1874)
Antiblemma rubida (Schaus 1911)
Antiblemma rubrifusca (Schaus 1911)
Antiblemma rubrilinea (Schaus 1911)
Antiblemma rufinans (Guenee 1852)
Antiblemma senilis (Butler 1879)
Antiblemma sexplagiata (Walker 1858)
Antiblemma solina (Stoll 1790)
Antiblemma spectanda (Moschler 1880)
Antiblemma stelligera (Schaus 1901)
Antiblemma sterope (Stoll 1780)
Antiblemma stictogyna Hampson 1926
Antiblemma strigatula Hampson 1926
Antiblemma strigilla (Guenee 1852)
Antiblemma stulta (Moschler 1880)
Antiblemma subrutilans (Walker 1858)
Antiblemma sufficiens (Walker 1858)
Antiblemma terrigena (Dognin 1912)
Antiblemma tetraspila (Walker 1858)
Antiblemma trepidula (Dognin 1912)
Antiblemma trogocycla Hampson 1926
Antiblemma trova (Dognin 1897)
Antiblemma tuisa (Schaus 1911)
Antiblemma turbata (Butler 1879)
Antiblemma tuva (Schaus 1911)
Antiblemma tyroe (Schaus 1914)
Antiblemma uncinata (Felder & Rogenhofer 1874)
Antiblemma undilla (Schaus 1901)
Antiblemma vacca (Schaus 1901)
Antiblemma versicolor (Herrich-Schaffer 1870)
Antiblemma virginia (Schaus 1906)

References
 Antiblemma at Markku Savela's Lepidoptera and Some Other Life Forms
 Natural History Museum Lepidoptera genus database

Catocalinae
Moth genera